Dichagyris terminicincta is a moth of the family Noctuidae. It is found in the Near East and Middle East, more specifically Lebanon, Israel, Turkey, Iran and
Afghanistan.

Adults are on wing from July to August. There is one generation per year.

External links
 Noctuinae of Israel

terminicincta
Insects of Turkey
Moths of the Middle East
Moths described in 1933